Gaolesiela Salang (born 12 February 1983 in Rakops) is a Botswana sprinter who specializes in the 400 metres.

He was a member of the Botswana 4 x 400 metres relay team that finished eighth at the 2004 Olympic Games.

External links
 

1983 births
Living people
People from Central District (Botswana)
Botswana male sprinters
Athletes (track and field) at the 2004 Summer Olympics
Olympic athletes of Botswana